Heinrich Felix Erich Kaiser-Titz (7 October 1875 – 22 November 1928) was a German stage and film actor.

Selected filmography
 Tales of Hoffmann (1916)
 His Coquettish Wife (1916)
 The Knitting Needles (1916)
 The Night Talk (1917)
 The Lost Paradise (1917)
 Ferdinand Lassalle (1918)
 The Serenyi (1918)
 Waves of Fate (1918)
 Cain (1918)
 The Night of Decision (1920)
 Man Overboard (1921)
 The Devil's Chains (1921)
 Miss Beryll (1921)
 Peter Voss, Thief of Millions (1921)
 The Island of the Lost (1921)
 The Women of Gnadenstein (1921)
 The Riddle of the Sphinx (1921)
 The Golden Bullet (1921)
 Marie Antoinette, the Love of a King (1922)
 Insulted and Humiliated (1922)
 Black Monday (1922)
 Shadows of the Past (1922)
 Tania, the Woman in Chains (1922)
 The Favourite of the Queen (1922)
 Sins of Yesterday (1922)
 The Love Nest (1922)
 Yvette, the Fashion Princess (1922)
 The Mistress of the King (1922)
 The Great Industrialist (1923)
 William Tell (1923)
 The Maharaja's Victory (1923)
 The Sensational Trial (1923)
 Darling of the King (1924)
 Spring Awakening (1924)
 Fever for Heights (1924)
 Marionettes of the Princess (1924)
 Malva (1924)
 Nelly, the Bride Without a Husband (1924)
 The Doomed (1924)
 The Game of Love (1924)
 Maud Rockefeller's Bet (1924)
 Claire (1924)
 The Creature (1924)
 The Fire Dancer (1925)
 Wallenstein (1925)
 In the Name of the Kaisers (1925)
 In the Valleys of the Southern Rhine (1925)
 Bismarck (1925)
 The Man Who Sold Himself (1925)
 The Adventure of Mr. Philip Collins (1925)
 The Brothers Schellenberg (1926)
 Her Husband's Wife (1926)
 Fedora (1926)
 Hell of Love (1926)
 The Armoured Vault (1926)
 The Trumpets are Blowing (1926)
 Hunted People (1926)
 Vienna, How it Cries and Laughs (1926)
 The Fallen (1926)
 People to Each Other (1926)
 White Slave Traffic (1926)
 The Convicted (1927)
 A Murderous Girl (1927)
 A Girl of the People (1927)
 Weekend Magic (1927)
 The Owl (1927)
 Heaven on Earth (1927)
 The Trial of Donald Westhof (1927)
 The Woman from Till 12 (1928)
 Hungarian Rhapsody (1928)
 When the Mother and the Daughter (1928)
 The Carousel of Death (1928)
 The Lady in Black (1928)
 Panic (1928)

Bibliography

External links

1875 births
1928 deaths
German male stage actors
German male film actors
German male silent film actors
Male actors from Berlin
20th-century German male actors